Kpwe (Mokpwe) is a Bantu language of Cameroon. It is mutually intelligible with Kole, and probably with Mboko (Wumboko) as well.

There are multiple variants of the name: based on 'Kpwe' (Bakpwe, Mokpwe), on 'Kpe' (Mokpe), on 'Kweɾi' (Kwedi, Kweli, Kwili, Kwiri, Bakwedi, Bakwele, Bakweri, Vakweli, Bekwiri), as well as Ujuwa, Vambeng.

References

 
Sawabantu languages
Languages of Cameroon

sw:Kiwumboko (lugha)